Mohammed Al Wakid (born 6 October 1985) is a Syrian professional footballer who plays as a striker for Syrian club Tishreen SC, on loan from Al-Jaish, and the Syria national team.

Club career 
On 19 January 2018, Al Wakid joined Riffa in the Bahraini Premier League; he scored two goals in the 2017–18 season.

Al Wakid returned to Al-Jaish on 27 July 2018; he finished as top goalscorer of the 2018–19 Syrian Premier League with 27 goals, breaking the previous league record of 29 goals set by Aref Al Agha in 1997–98. Al-Jaish renewed his contract a further year. Al Waked was league top goalscorer once again, in 2019–20, scoring 21 goals; his contract was renewed two further seasons.

On 7 May 2021, Lebanese Premier League club Ahed announced the signing of Al Wakid on loan from Al-Jaish, for the 2021 AFC Cup campaign.

International career 
Al-Wakid made his senior international debut for Syria on 20 March 2019, as a starter in a friendly against Iraq.

Honours
Al-Jaish
 Syrian Premier League: 2009–10, 2016–17, 2018–19
 Syrian Super Cup: 2018, 2019

Al-Shorta
 Syrian Premier League: 2011–12

Individual
 Syrian Premier League top goalscorer: 2018–19, 2019–20

Notes

References

External links

 
 
 

1985 births
Living people
Sportspeople from Damascus
Syrian footballers
Association football forwards
Al-Majd players
Al-Jaish Damascus players
Al-Shorta Damascus players
Amanat Baghdad players
Al-Ittihad Aleppo players
Ohod Club players
Riffa SC players
Al Ahed FC players
Syrian Premier League players
Iraqi Premier League players
Bahraini Premier League players
Syria international footballers
Syrian expatriate footballers
Expatriate footballers in Jordan
Expatriate footballers in Iraq
Expatriate footballers in Saudi Arabia
Expatriate footballers in Bahrain
Expatriate footballers in Lebanon
Syrian expatriate sportspeople in Jordan
Syrian expatriate sportspeople in Iraq
Syrian expatriate sportspeople in Saudi Arabia
Syrian expatriate sportspeople in Bahrain
Syrian expatriate sportspeople in Lebanon